Harald Herlofson (18 February 1887 – 17 November 1957) was a Norwegian rower who competed for Christiania Roklub. He competed in men's eight at the 1912 Summer Olympics in Stockholm. He was the brother of footballer Charles Herlofson.

References

External links

 

1887 births
1957 deaths
People from Arendal
Norwegian male rowers
Rowers at the 1912 Summer Olympics
Olympic rowers of Norway
Sportspeople from Agder